Torneio do Povo (meaning Tournament of the People) was a competition contested between the most popular Brazilian football clubs between 1971 and 1973. It was organized by the Brazilian Sports Confederation (CBD), and was played in the beginning of the year, starting the season.

The first edition of the competition was between Atlético Mineiro, Corinthians, Flamengo and Internacional. For the second edition, Bahia was invited. Due to its successful performance in the Campeonato Brasileiro second edition, finishing in the fifth place, Coritiba was invited to participate in the competition's third edition, which was promoted by Flamengo's president at the time, André Richer. André Richer considered the idea of inviting Botafogo, which was the 1972 Campeonato Brasileiro runner-up.

Format
In 1971, the competition was a double round-robin format between four teams. The champion was the team with the most points.

In 1972, the competition was also a round-robin format, but the five clubs only played once against each other. The champion was the club with most points.

In 1973, the Torneio do Povo was divided in two rounds. In the first round, the teams played against each other once. The four best placed clubs advanced to the next round. The second round was in a single round-robin format. The champion was the club with the most points.

List of champions

Torneio do Povo 1971
Champion: Corinthians
Runner-up: Internacional

Final standings

Torneio do Povo 1972
Champion: Flamengo
Runner-up: Atlético Mineiro

Single Round-robin

Final standings

Torneio do Povo 1973
Champion: Coritiba
Runner-up: Bahia

First stage

Standings

Quadrangular Final (Final Stage)

Standings

References

External links
RSSSF

Torneio do Povo